Joakim Alriksson (born August 18, 1992), is a Swedish footballer who plays for Enskede IK as a midfielder.

Career
He made his debut against Halmstads BK on 7 November 2010 in the last round of Allsvenskan, while still playing for the junior squad. He was moved up to the senior squad for the 2011 season.

References

External links
 
 
 

1992 births
Swedish footballers
Living people
Djurgårdens IF Fotboll players
Ängelholms FF players
AFC Eskilstuna players
Enskede IK players
Allsvenskan players
Sweden youth international footballers
Association football forwards